The neblina slender opossum (Marmosops neblina) is an opossum species from South America. It is found in Brazil, Ecuador, Venezuela, and perhaps Peru.

References

Opossums
Marsupials of South America
Mammals of Brazil
Mammals of Ecuador
Mammals of Peru
Mammals of Venezuela
Mammals described in 1990